Xerxes was a 6th-century Sassanid Persian prince who distinguished himself in war against the Byzantine Empire.

He was the son of the Sasanian king Kavad I, and is first mentioned as a Sasanian general during the Iberian War between the Byzantine and Sassanid Empires. In 528, Xerxes leading an army numbering 30,000 men defeated the Byzantines at the Battle of Thannuris by stratagem, killing or capturing many of them along with their commanders.

However, the victory was costly, and the army of Xerxes had lost ca. 500 of his Immortal units. These losses enraged Kavadh I, who had Coutzes imprisoned and disgraced Xerxes.

Sources

6th-century Iranian people
Sasanian princes
Generals of Kavad I
People of the Roman–Sasanian Wars
Iberian War